KEXB may refer to:

 KEXB (AM), a radio station (1440 AM) licensed to University Park, Texas, United States
 KTNO (AM), a radio station (620 AM) licensed to Plano, Texas, United States, which held the call sign KEXB from 2015 to 2019